"Straighten It Out" is the second single by Pete Rock & CL Smooth from their album, Mecca and the Soul Brother, which was released to critical acclaim in 1992. The song deals with bootleggers and sample clearance opportunists. Unlike the previous single, "They Reminisce Over You (T.R.O.Y.)", "Straighten It Out" did not chart on the Billboard Hot 100. The song contains a sample from "Our Generation" by Ernie Hines.

Track listing 
 Side A
1. Straighten It Out (Vocal) (4:12)
2. Straighten It Out (Vocal Remix) (4:18)
3. Straighten It Out (Instrumental) (4:14)
 Side B
1. They Reminisce Over You (T.R.O.Y.) (Remix) (4:55)
2. They Reminisce Over You (T.R.O.Y.) (Remix Instrumental) (4:44)
3. Straighten It Out (Remix Instrumental) (4:14)

Pete Rock songs
1992 singles
1992 songs
Elektra Records singles
Song recordings produced by Pete Rock
Songs written by Pete Rock
Songs written by CL Smooth